Federal Highway 150 (Carretera Federal 150) or colloquially called Carretera Puebla - Tehuacan, Carretera Tehuacan - Orizaba, is a Federal Highway of Mexico. The highway travels from Mexico City in the west to Veracruz, Veracruz in the east. Federal Highway 150 is one of five Mexican Federal Highways that terminate in Mexico's capital city.

References

150